Sébastien Le Prestre de Vauban, Seigneur de Vauban, later Marquis de Vauban (baptised 15 May 163330 March 1707), commonly referred to as Vauban, was a French military engineer who worked under Louis XIV. He is generally considered the greatest engineer of his time, and one of the most important in European military history.

His principles for fortifications were widely used for nearly 100 years, while aspects of his offensive tactics remained in use until the mid-twentieth century. He viewed civilian infrastructure as closely connected to military effectiveness and worked on many of France's major ports, as well as projects like the Canal de la Bruche, which remain in use today.

His economic tract, used statistics in support of his arguments, making it a precursor of modern economics. Later destroyed by royal decree, it contained radical proposals for a more even distribution of the tax burden. His application of rational and scientific methods to problem-solving, whether engineering or social, anticipated an approach common in the Age of Enlightenment.

Perhaps the most enduring aspect of Vauban's legacy was his view of France as a geographical entity. His advocacy of giving up territory for a more coherent and defensible border was unusual for the period; the boundaries of the French state he proposed in the north and east have changed very little in the four centuries since.

Early life and education

Sébastien le Prestre de Vauban was born in May 1633, in Saint-Léger-de-Foucheret, renamed Saint-Léger-Vauban by Napoleon III in 1867, in the Yonne, now part of Bourgogne-Franche-Comté. His parents, Urbain Le Prestre ( 1602–1652) and Edmée de Cormignolle (died c. 1651), were members of the minor nobility, from Vauban in Bazoches. 

In 1570, his grandfather Jacques Le Prestre acquired Château de Bazoches, when he married Françoise de la Perrière, an illegitimate daughter of the Comte de Bazoches, who died intestate. The 30-year legal battle by the Le Prestre family to retain the property proved financially ruinous, forcing Urbain to become a forestry worker. He also designed gardens for the local gentry, including the owners of the Château de Ruère, where Vauban spent his early years.

His only sister, Charlotte (1638–1645?), died young, but he had many relatives; his cousin, Paul le Prestre (c. 1630 – 1703), was an army officer who supervised construction of Les Invalides. Three of Paul's sons served in the army, two of whom were killed in action in 1676 and 1677. The third, Antoine (1654–1731), became Vauban's assistant and later a lieutenant-general; in 1710, he was appointed Governor of Béthune for life, while he inherited Vauban's titles and the bulk of his lands.

Vauban's family was impacted by the domestic conflict and foreign wars, including the Huguenot rebellions of the 1620s, the 1635–1659 Franco-Spanish War, and 1648 to 1653 Fronde; his Catholic grandfather married a Protestant from La Rochelle, and served Huguenot leader Admiral Coligny, while two of his uncles died in the war with Spain.

Career

In 1643, at the age of ten, Vauban was sent to the Carmelite college in Semur-en-Auxois, where he was taught the basics of mathematics, science and geometry. His father's work was also relevant; the design of neo-classical gardens and fortifications were closely linked, since they both concerned managing space. It was common to combine these skills; John Armstrong (1674–1742), Marlborough's chief military engineer, laid out the lake and gardens at Blenheim Palace.

In 1650, Vauban joined the household of his local magnate, the Prince de Condé, where he met de Montal; a close neighbour from Nièvre, the two were colleagues for many years, and often worked together. During the 1650–1653 Fronde des nobles, Condé was arrested by the Regency Council, led by Louis XIV's mother Anne of Austria and Cardinal Mazarin. After being released in 1652, he and his supporters, among them Vauban and de Montal, went into exile in the Spanish Netherlands and allied with the Spanish.

In early 1653, when Vauban worked on the defences of Sainte-Menehould, one of Condé's principal possessions, he was captured by a Royalist patrol and switched sides, serving in the force led by Louis Nicolas de Clerville that took Sainte-Menehould in November 1653. Clerville, later appointed Commissaire général des fortifications, employed him on siege operations and building fortifications. In 1655, Vauban was appointed Ingénieur du Roi or Royal Engineer, and by the time the war with Spain ended in 1659, he was known as a talented engineer of energy and courage.

Under the terms of the Treaty of the Pyrenees, Spain ceded much of French Flanders, and Vauban was put in charge of fortifying newly acquired towns such as Dunkirk. This pattern of French territorial gains, followed by fortification of new strongpoints, was followed in the 1667–1668 War of Devolution, 1672–1678 Franco-Dutch War and 1683-1684 War of the Reunions. 

The first fortification Vauban designed was the 1673 siege of Maastricht, although he was subordinate to Louis, who ranked as the senior officer present, and thus took credit for its capture. Vauban was rewarded with a large sum of money, which he used to purchase the Château de Bazouches from his cousin in 1675.

Post-1673, French strategy in Flanders was based on a memorandum from Vauban to Louvois, Minister of War, setting out a proposed line of fortresses known as the Ceinture de fer, or iron belt (see Map). He was made Maréchal de camp in 1676, and succeeded Clerville as Commissaire general des fortifications in 1677.

During the Nine Years' War, he supervised the capture of Namur in 1692, the major French achievement of the war, while the 1697 siege of Ath is often considered his offensive masterpiece. He was rewarded with money, and made Comte de Vauban, a member of the Order of the Holy Spirit and Order of Saint Louis, and an Honorary Member of the French Academy of Sciences.

The numbers needed to conduct a siege, and prevent interference from opponents meant armies of the Nine Years' War often exceeded 100,000 men, sizes unsustainable for pre-industrial societies. It prompted a change in tactics, Marlborough arguing winning one battle was more beneficial than taking 12 fortresses. The armies of the War of the Spanish Succession averaged around 35,000, and siege warfare superseded by a greater emphasis on mobility. 

In 1703, Vauban was promoted Maréchal de France, marking the end of his military career, although the Ceinture de fer proved its worth after the French defeat at Ramillies in 1706. Under pressure from superior forces on multiple fronts, France's northern border remained largely intact despite repeated efforts to break it. Capturing Lille cost the Allies 12,000 casualties and most of the 1708 campaigning season; the lack of progress between 1706 and 1712 enabled Louis to reach an acceptable deal at Utrecht in 1713, as opposed to the humiliating terms presented in 1707.

With more leisure time, Vauban developed a broader view of his role. His fortifications were designed for mutual support, so they required connecting roads, bridges and canals; garrisons needed to be fed, so he prepared maps showing the location of forges, forests and farms. Since these had to be paid for, he developed an interest in tax policy, and in 1707 published La Dîme royale, documenting the economic misery of the lower classes. His solution was a flat 10% tax on all agricultural and industrial output, and eliminating the exemptions which meant most of the nobility and clergy paid nothing. Although confiscated and destroyed by royal decree, the use of statistics to support his arguments "... establishes him as a founder of modern economics, and precursor of the Enlightenment's socially concerned intellectuals."

In the course of his career, Vauban supervised or designed the building of more than 300 separate fortifications,  and by his own estimate, supervised more than 40 sieges from 1653 to 1697.

Personal life and death

In 1660, Vauban married Jeanne d'Aunay d'Epiry (ca 1640–1705); they had two daughters, Charlotte (1661–1709) and Jeanne Françoise (1678–1713), as well as a short-lived infant son. He also had a long-term relationship with Marie-Antoinette de Puy-Montbrun, daughter of an exiled Huguenot officer, usually referred to as 'Mademoiselle de Villefranche.'

Vauban died in Paris on 30 March 1707; buried near his home in Bazoches, his grave was destroyed during the French Revolution. In 1808, Napoleon I ordered his heart reburied in Les Invalides, resting place for many of France's most famous soldiers.

Doctrines and legacy

Offensive doctrines; siege warfare

While his modern fame rests on the fortifications he built, Vauban's greatest innovations were in offensive operations, an approach he summarised as 'More powder, less blood.' Initially reliant on existing concepts, he later adapted these on lines set out in his memorandum of March 1672, Mémoire pour servir à l'instruction dans la conduite des sièges.

In this period, sieges became the dominant form of warfare; during the 1672–1678 Franco-Dutch War, three battles were fought in the Spanish Netherlands, of which only Seneffe was unrelated to a siege. Their importance was heightened by Louis XIV, who viewed them as low-risk opportunities for demonstrating his military skill and increasing his prestige; he was present at 20 of those conducted by Vauban.

The 'siege parallel' had been in development since the mid-16th century but Vauban brought the idea to practical fulfilment at Maastricht in 1673. Three parallel trenches were dug in front of the walls, the earth thus excavated being used to create embankments screening the attackers from defensive fire, while bringing them as close to the assault point as possible (see diagram). Artillery was moved into the trenches, allowing them to target the base of the walls at close range, with the defenders unable to depress their own guns enough to counter this; once a breach had been made, it was then stormed. This approach was used in offensive operations well into the 20th century.

However, Vauban adapted his approach to the situation, and did not use the siege parallel again until Valenciennes in 1677. Always willing to challenge accepted norms, at Valenciennes, he proposed assaulting the breach during the day, rather than at night as was normal practice. He argued this would reduce casualties by surprising the defenders, and allow better co-ordination among the assault force; he was supported by Louis, and the attack proved successful.

Vauban made several innovations in the use of siege artillery, including ricochet firing, and concentrating on specific parts of the fortifications, rather than targeting multiple targets. His Dutch rival Menno van Coehoorn employed a similar approach. While the 'Van Coehoorn method' sought to overwhelm defences with massive firepower, such as the Grand Battery of 200 guns at Namur in 1695, Vauban preferred a more gradual approach. Both had their supporters; Vauban argued his was less costly in terms of casualties, but it took more time, an important consideration in an age when far more soldiers died from disease than in combat.

Defensive doctrines; fortifications

It was accepted even the strongest fortifications would fall, given time; the process was so well understood by the 1690s, betting on the length of a siege became a popular craze. As few states could afford large standing armies, defenders needed time to mobilise; to provide this, fortresses were designed to absorb the attackers' energies, similar to the use of crumple zones in modern cars. The French defence of Namur in 1695 showed "how one could effectively win a campaign, by losing a fortress, but exhausting the besiegers."

As with the siege parallel, the strength of Vauban's defensive designs was his ability to synthesise and adapt the work of others to create a more powerful whole. His first works used the 'star-shape' or bastion fort design, also known as the trace Italienne, based on the designs of Antoine de Ville (1596–1656) and Blaise Pagan (1603–1665). His subsequent 'systems' strengthened their internal works with the addition of casemated shoulders and flanks.

The principles of Vauban's 'second system' were set out in the 1683 work Le Directeur-Général des fortifications, and used at Landau and Mont-Royal, near Traben-Trarbach; both were advanced positions, intended as stepping-off points for French offensives into the Rhineland. Fort-Louis was another new construction, built on an island in the middle of the Rhine; this allowed Vauban to combine his defensive principles with town planning, although like Mont-Royal, little of it remains.
 
The French retreat from the Rhine after 1697 required new fortresses; Neuf-Brisach was the most significant, designed on Vauban's 'third system', and completed after his death by Louis de Cormontaigne. Using ideas from Fort-Louis, this incorporated a regular square grid street pattern inside an octagonal fortification; tenement blocks were built inside each curtain wall, strengthening the defensive walls and shielding more expensive houses from cannon fire.

To create a more coherent border, Vauban advocated destroying poor fortifications, and relinquishing territory that was hard to defend. In December 1672, he wrote to Louvois: "I am not for the greater number of places, we already have too many, and please God we had half of that, but all in good condition!" 

Many of the fortifications designed by Vauban are still standing; in 2008, twelve groups of Vauban fortifications were inscribed on the UNESCO World Heritage List for their exceptional engineering and influence on military fortifications from the 17th through the 20th centuries.

Infrastructure and engineering
 
While often overlooked, Vauban worked on many civilian infrastructure projects, including rebuilding the ports of Brest, Dunkerque and Toulon. Since his fortifications were designed for mutual support, roads and waterways were an essential part of their design, such as the Canal de la Bruche, a  canal built in 1682 to transport materials for the fortification of Strasbourg. As early as 1684, Vauban published design tables for retaining walls with heights of 3 m < H < 25 m. Three years later, Vauban, in his role as newly appointed Commissary General of all French fortifications, sent his engineers in the Corps du Génie Militaire his Profil général pour les murs de soutènement in which he presented his retaining wall profiles that were later adopted by engineering offers such as Bélidor (1729), Poncelet (1840) and Wheeler (1870). He also provided advice on the repair and enlargement of the Canal du Midi in 1686.

His holistic approach to urban planning, which integrated city defences with layout and infrastructure, is most obvious at Neuf-Brisach. His legacy is recognised in the Vauban district in Freiburg, developed as a model for sustainable neighbourhoods post-1998.

Vauban's 'scientific approach' and focus on large infrastructure projects strongly influenced American military and civil engineering and inspired the creation of the US Corps of Engineers in 1824. Until 1866, West Point's curriculum was modelled on that of the French Ecole Polytechnique, and designed to produce officers with skills in engineering and mathematics.

To ensure a steady supply of skilled engineers, in 1690 Vauban established the Corps royal des ingénieurs militaires; until his death, candidates had to pass an examination administered by Vauban himself. Young French Huguenots made up a disproportionately high number of successful engineers due to the social and educational characteristics of French Protestantism. After the Revocation of the Edict of Nantes in 1685, a significant number of these engineers joined the English and Dutch armies to fight in Ireland, Flanders and Spain. Many of his publications, including Traité de l'attaque des places and Traité des mines, were written at the end of his career to provide a training curriculum for his successors.

Assessment

Vauban's offensive tactics remained relevant for centuries; his principles were clearly identifiable in those used by the Việt Minh at Dien Bien Phu in 1954. His defensive fortifications dated far more quickly, partly due to the enormous investment required; Vauban himself estimated that in 1678, 1694 and 1705, between 40 and 45% of the French army was assigned to garrison duty.

Vauban's reputation meant his designs remained in use long after developments in artillery made them obsolete, for example the Dutch fort of Bourtange, built in 1742. The Corps des ingénieurs militaires was based on his teachings; between 1699 and 1743, only 631 new candidates were accepted, the vast majority relatives of existing or former members. As a result, French military engineering became ultra-conservative, while many 'new' works used his designs, or professed to do so, such as those built by Louis de Cortmontaigne at Metz in 1728–1733. This persisted into the late 19th century; Fort de Queuleu, built in 1867 near Metz, is recognisably a Vauban-style design.

Some French engineers continued to be innovators, notably the Marquis de Montalembert, who published La Fortification perpendiculaire in 1776. A rejection of the principles advocated by Vauban and his successors, his ideas became the prevailing orthodoxy in much of Europe, but were dismissed in France.

See also
 Vauban fortifications
 Fortifications of Vauban UNESCO World Heritage Sites: UNESCO World Heritage Sites preserving many of Vauban's fortifications.

Notes

References

Sources
 
 
 
 
 
 ;
 
 
 
 
 
 
 
 
 
 
 ;

Bibliography
 
 
 

1633 births
1707 deaths
French military engineers
French military personnel of the Nine Years' War
French marquesses
Marshals of France
Members of the French Academy of Sciences
Military theorists
People from Yonne
Knights of the Order of Saint Louis
Forestry in France
17th-century French architects
18th-century French architects
Military personnel of the Franco-Spanish War (1635–1659)